Susan Pratt (born April 29, 1956) is an American actress.

Pratt is best known for her roles in daytime television as Anne Logan on General Hospital (1978–1982), Claire Ramsey on Guiding Light (1983–1986, 2000–2002), and Barbara Montgomery on All My Children (1987–1991, 1995, 1997, 1998, February 9-July 12, 2007). She was also credited as Susan O'Hanlon in the role of Captain Nicole Davidoff (16 episodes, 1978–1980) in the Saturday morning series, Jason of Star Command.

Career
Pratt started her career in 1976, and many of her roles were on daytime television. Those roles include sweet nurse Anne Logan (Audrey Hardy's niece) on General Hospital (1978–1982), tough doctor Claire Ramsey (who had an affair with Ed Bauer, giving birth to his daughter, Michelle) on Guiding Light (1983–1986, 2000–2002), and ambitious businesswoman Barbara Montgomery (Travis's ex-wife who married Tom Cudahy but continued to sleep with Travis) on All My Children (1987–1991, 1995, 1997, 1998, February 9-July 12, 2007). She had short-term roles on Loving and As the World Turns before making return appearances to both "AMC" and "GL". For her role as Barbara Montgomery Cudahy, she received a Soap Opera Digest Nomination for Best Supporting Actress.

Personal life
Pratt has been married twice. She was married to George O'Hanlon Jr. from 1976 until their divorce in 1980. In 1981, she married Alfredo Pecora. The couple have three children together: Sophia Pecora, Giancarlo Pecora, and Lorenna Pecora.

Filmography

Film

Television

References

External links
http://www.tv.com/people/susan-pratt/
Claire Ramsey profile from GL Online
Barbara Montgomery profile from The AMC Pages
Annie Logan profile from GH Online

1956 births
American soap opera actresses
Living people
21st-century American women